Ðurići is a village in the municipality of Herceg Novi, Montenegro. The settlement includes the village of Kamenari and is located along the coast of the Verige Strait.

Demographics
According to the 2011 census, its population was 300.

References

Populated places in Herceg Novi Municipality
Populated places in Bay of Kotor